Robin Bailey (1919–1999) was an English actor.

Robin Bailey may also refer to:
Robin Wayne Bailey (born 1952), American writer

See also
Robin Bailie (born 1937), Northern Irish solicitor and former politician